Wayne Township is one of eleven townships in Montgomery County, Indiana, United States. As of the 2010 census, its population was 1,590 and it contained 691 housing units.

Geography

Cities, towns, villages
 Waynetown

Unincorporated towns
 Wesley at

Cemeteries
The township contains these two cemeteries: Potts and Thompson.

Major highways
  Interstate 74
  U.S. Route 136

School districts
 North Montgomery Community School Corporation

Political districts
 Indiana's 4th congressional district
 State House District 41
 State Senate District 23

References
 
 United States Census Bureau 2008 TIGER/Line Shapefiles
 IndianaMap

External links
 Indiana Township Association
 United Township Association of Indiana
 City-Data.com page for Wayne Township

Townships in Montgomery County, Indiana
Townships in Indiana